The discography of the Flaming Lips, an American rock band formed in 1983, consists of 16 studio albums, 18 extended plays, 15 singles, 10 compilation albums, four video albums and an array of various other appearances.

Studio albums

Compilations

Extended plays
{| class="wikitable plainrowheaders"
|-
! scope="col"|Title
! scope="col"|EP details
! scope="col"|Notes
|-
! scope="row"| The Flaming Lips
|
Released: 1984
Labels: Lovely Sorts of Death, Restless, Enigma/Pink Dust
|
|-
! scope="row"| Unconsciously Screamin'''
|
Released: 1990
Labels: Atavistic, City Slang
|CD single containing the non-album tracks "Ma, I Didn't Notice", "Lucifer Rising", and "Let Me Be It"
|-
! scope="row"| Yeah, I Know It's a Drag... But Wastin' Pigs Is Still Radical|
Released: October 31, 1991
Label: Warner Bros.
|
|-
! scope="row"| Due to High Expectations... the Flaming Lips Are Providing Needles for Your Balloons|
Released: July 12, 1994
Label: Warner Bros.
|Peaked at No. 182 on the US Billboard 200
|-
! scope="row"| The Southern Oklahoma Cosmic Trigger Contest|
Released: March 10, 2001
Label: Independent
|
|-
! scope="row"| Fight Test|
Released: April 22, 2003
Label: Warner Bros.
|CD single containing non-album tracks "The Strange Design of Conscience" and "Thank You Jack White (for the Fiber-Optic Jesus That You Gave Me)"
Peaked at No. 93 on the US Billboard 200
|-
! scope="row"| Ego Tripping at the Gates of Hell|
Released: November 18, 2003
Label: Warner Bros.
|CD single non-album tracks "Assassination of the Sun", "I'm a Fly in a Sunbeam (Following the Funeral Procession of a Stranger)", "Sunship Balloons", and "A Change at Christmas (Say It Isn't So)"
|-
! scope="row"| Yoshimi Wins! (Live Radio Sessions)|
Released: November 15, 2005
Label: Warner Bros.
|
|-
! scope="row"| It Overtakes Me|
Released: November 13, 2006
Label: Warner Bros.
|CD single containing non-album track "I'm Afraid of Dying... Aren't You?"
|-
! scope="row" | Paranoia and Peace (with Tame Impala)
|
 Released: October 29, 2013
Label: Lovely Sorts of Death
|Split vinyl EP sold at Halloween concerts, with the Flaming Lips covering Tame Impala and Tame Impala covering the Flaming Lips.
|-
! scope="row"| Peace Sword|
Released: October 29, 2013
Label: Warner Bros.
|The title track, "Peace Sword (Open Your Heart)", was written for the film Ender's Game. The other tracks on the EP, however, were not accepted by the producers.
|}

Singles

The Flaming Lips 2011 series

Other appearances
Studio

 Radio 

Live
 "Thank You" and "Death Valley '69" - 1988 split single with the Fleshtones and Steve Kilbey
 "Whole Lotta Love" - 2005 soundtrack Fearless Freaks "Gates of Steel" - 2014 split single with Devo

Video albums

Guest appearances
Albums
 Good News for People Who Love Bad News (2004) – Modest Mouse – additional instrumentation ("The Good Times Are Killing Me")
 "My Mechanical Friend" (2012) – Grace Potter – co-writing and instrumentation
 Warrior (2012) – Kesha – producer ("Past Lives")
 Miley Cyrus and Her Dead Petz'' (2015) – Miley Cyrus – producer ("Dooo It!", "Karen Don't Be Sad", "The Floyd Song (Sunrise)", "Something About Space Dude", "Fuckin Fucked Up", "BB Talk", "Milky Milky Milk", "Cyrus Skies", "I'm So Drunk", "Tangerine", "Tiger Dreams", "Evil Is But a Shadow" and "Miley Tibetan Bowlzzz")

Singles
 "The Golden Path" (2003) – The Chemical Brothers

Notes

References

Discography
Discographies of American artists
Rock music group discographies